Gumlow is a locality in the City of Townsville, Queensland, Australia.

History 
The locality was named and bounded on 27 July 1991.

Geography
The Bohle River forms most of the eastern boundary, and the Little Bohle River most of the northern.

References 

City of Townsville
Localities in Queensland